Pollatoomary is the deepest explored underwater cave in Ireland.
The explored limit of Pollatoomary is also  deeper underwater than that of the terminal sump in Wookey Hole Caves in Somerset, England, which previously held the record for the deepest underwater cave in Britain and Ireland.

Location
The cave entrance is on privately owned farmland.

Exploration
J. C. Coleman's 1965 compendium, The Caves of Ireland, states: "Pollatoomary Rising ... thought to be the rising of the Aille water. The water rises through fissures in the limestone."

At the time, this made it the deepest known sump in Ireland, and by 1985 it still held second place.

30 years after Farr's first exploration, one of his students, Artur Kozłowski, began to concentrate his efforts on the cave. This made it the deepest sump in Ireland by far, and additionally it surpassed the British cave diving depth record.

Pollatoomary was entered again on 9 June 2018 by Michał Marek, who explored the cave to  underwater.

References

Caves of the Republic of Ireland